, abbreviated as Chuden in Japanese, is a Japanese electric utilities provider for the middle Chūbu region of the Honshu island of Japan.  It provides electricity at 60 Hz, though an area of Nagano Prefecture uses 50 Hz. Chubu Electric Power ranks third among Japan's largest electric utilities in terms of power generation capacity, electric energy sold, and annual revenue. It is also one of Nagoya's "four influential companies" along with Meitetsu, Matsuzakaya, and Toho Gas. Recently, the company has also expanded into the business of optical fibers. On January 1, 2006, a new company, Chubu Telecommunications, was formed.

Recent news
In May 2011, Prime Minister Naoto Kan requested that the Hamaoka Nuclear Power Plant, which sits in an area considered overdue for a large earthquake, be shut down, after which Chubu Electric Power suspended operations at the plant. A lawsuit seeking the decommissioning of the reactors at the Hamaoka plant permanently has been filed.

In August 2013, Chubu announced it would acquire an 80% stake in the Tokyo-based electricity supplier, Diamond Corp, marking the firm's entry into a market usually associated with Tokyo Electric Power Company (TEPCO).

November 2019 it was announced Chubu had acquired a 20% stake (Mitsubishi the other 80%) in the Dutch energy company Eneco.

In April 2020, the logo mark was renewed.  The renewed logo is named "The Beam."

Power Stations
The company has 194 separate generating stations with a total capacity of 32,473 MW.

Hydroelectric

The company has 182 separate hydro generating stations with a total capacity of 5,217 MW.
Iwazu Hydroelectric Generating Station
Kamiōsu Dam (1,500 MW)
Takane Dam I (340 MW)
Takane Dam II (25 MW)
Kamiasō Dam

Thermal power stations 
The company has 11 separate thermal power stations with a total capacity of 22,369 MW.
 Kawagoe Power Station (Natural Gas, Combined cycle, 4,802 MW)
 Chita Thermal Power Station (Natural Gas,1,708 MW)
 Atsumi Thermal Power Station (crude and heavy oil, 1,400 MW)
 Nishi-Nagoya Thermal Power Station (Natural Gas, 2,376 MW)
 Hekinan Thermal Power Station (Coal, 4,100 MW)
 Shin-Nagoya Thermal Power Station (Natural gas, Combined cycle, 1,458 MW)
 Chita Daini Thermal Power Station (Natural gas, 1,708 MW)
 Taketoyo Thermal Power Station (coal and biomass, 1,070 MW)
 Owase Mita Thermal Power Station (crude and heavy oil, 875 MW)
 Yokkaichi Thermal Power Station (Natural Gas, 1,245 MW)
 Goreway Power Station (Natural Gas, 839.1 MW) in Brampton, Ontario, Canada, and co-owned with Toyota Tsusho
 More

Nuclear power stations

 Hamaoka Nuclear Power Plant
On 6 May 2011, Prime Minister Naoto Kan requested the Hamaoka Nuclear Power Plant be shut down as an earthquake of magnitude 8.0 or higher is estimated 87% likely to hit the area within the next 30 years. Kan wanted to avoid a possible repeat of the Fukushima I nuclear accidents. On 9 May 2011, Chubu Electric decided to comply with the government request. In July 2011, a mayor in Shizuoka Prefecture and a group of residents filed a lawsuit seeking the decommissioning of the reactors at the Hamaoka nuclear power plant permanently.

Other facilities
Higashi-Shimizu Frequency Converter

References

External links 
 
 Chubu Electric Power Financial Report for Fiscal 2010
  Wiki collection of bibliographic works on Chubu Electric Power

 
Electric power companies of Japan
Natural gas companies of Japan
Nuclear power companies of Japan
Companies based in Nagoya
Energy companies established in 1951
Non-renewable resource companies established in 1951
Japanese companies established in 1951
Companies listed on the Osaka Exchange